The men's 300 metre free rifle kneeling event was one of five free rifle events in shooting at the 1900 Summer Olympics in Paris. It was an individual kneeling position event, and competitors' scores also counted towards the individual and team three-position events. It was held from 3 to 5 August. There were 30 competitors from 6 nations, with each nation having a team of 5 shooters. Medals were given for individual high scores in each of the three positions, overall individual high scores, and the scores of the five shooters were summed to give a team score. The kneeling position was won by Konrad Stäheli of Switzerland, with Emil Kellenberger of Switzerland and Anders Peter Nielsen of Denmark tying for silver.

Background

This was the only appearance of the men's 300 metre kneeling rifle event. A three-positions event was also included in 1900 (summing the scores of the standing, kneeling, and prone competitions); the three-positions event continued, but future Games would not have separate kneeling-position events in this format.

Seven of the nine medalists at the world championships since the world championships began in 1897 were competing. The world champions were Frank Jullien of Switzerland (1897, not competing in Paris) and Konrad Stäheli of Switzerland (1898 and 1899). Stäheli was a heavy favourite to win. The Olympic event doubled as the 1900 world championship.

Competition format

The competition had each shooter fire 40 shots from the kneeling position. The target was 1 metre in diameter, with 10 scoring rings; targets were set at a distance of 300 metres. Thus, the maximum score possible was 400 points. The scores from this event were combined with the other two positions (standing and prone) to give a three-positions individual score as well as a team score.

Schedule

Results

Each shooter fired 40 shots, for a total possible of 400 points.

References

 International Olympic Committee medal winners database
 De Wael, Herman. Herman's Full Olympians: "Shooting 1900". Accessed 3 March 2006.
 

Men's rifle military kneeling
Men's 300m kneeling